In stochastic processes, Kramers–Moyal expansion refers to a Taylor series expansion of the master equation, named after Hans Kramers and José Enrique Moyal. This expansion transforms the integro-differential master equation 

where  (for brevity, this probability is denoted by ) is the transition probability density, to an infinite order partial differential equation

where

Here  is the transition probability rate.

Pawula theorem
The Pawula theorem states that the expansion either stops after the first term or the second term. If the expansion continues past the second term it must contain an infinite number of terms, in order that the solution to the equation be interpretable as a probability density function.

Implementations
 Implementation as a python package

References

Statistical mechanics
Stochastic calculus